Gavin Thomson McKiddie (born 17 May 1940) is a Scottish former first-class cricketer.

McKiddie was born in May 1940 at Forfar, where he was educated at Forfar Academy. A club cricketer for Strathmore Cricket Club, McKiddie made a single appearance for Scotland in first-class cricket against Ireland at Dublin in 1977; he had been called up to the Scotland squad as a last minute injury replacement for the Scottish captain George Goddard. Batting twice in the match at the tail, he was dismissed for 8 runs in the Scottish first innings by John Elder, while in their second innings he was dismissed for 2 runs by the same bowler. He took two wickets with his off break bowling, dismissing Irish captain Alec O'Riordan in their first innings and Dermott Monteith in their second innings. Outside of cricket, McKiddie was a quantity surveyor.

References

External links
 

1940 births
Living people
People from Forfar
People educated at Forfar Academy
Scottish cricketers